Las furias (Spanish for "the furies") is a 1960 Argentine drama film directed by Vlasta Lah, based on the 1950 play of the same name by Enrique Suárez de Deza. The first Argentine sound film directed by a woman, it was the directorial debut for Lah, who became the only woman film director in 1960s Latin America. Its cast is almost exclusively female, starring Mecha Ortiz, Olga Zubarry, Aída Luz, Alba Mujica and Elsa Daniel as characters whose name are not presented, being introduced as "the Mother", "the Lover", "the Wife", "the Sister" and "the Daughter", respectively. 

In 2022, it was included in the list of The 100 Greatest Films of Argentine Cinema at number 50, a poll organized by the specialized magazines La vida útil, Taipei and La tierra quema, which was presented at the Mar del Plata International Film Festival. Also in 2022, the film was included in Spanish magazine Fotogramass list of the 20 best Argentine films of all time.

Cast 
 Mecha Ortiz as the Mother
 Olga Zubarry as the Lover
 Aída Luz as the Wife
 Alba Mujica as the Sister
 Elsa Daniel as the Daughter
 Guillermo Bredeston as the Boyfriend

References

External links 
 Las furias at Cinenacional.com (in Spanish) 
 

1960 films
1960s Spanish-language films
Argentine black-and-white films
1960s Argentine films